The Nūhaka River is a river of the Gisborne and Hawke's Bay regions of New Zealand's North Island. It flows generally south from its sources in rough coastal hill country south of Gisborne, reaching the sea at Nūhaka, close to the northern end of Hawke Bay.

See also
List of rivers of New Zealand

References

Rivers of the Hawke's Bay Region
Rivers of the Gisborne District
Rivers of New Zealand